Narahi is a village located in Ballia Sadar tehsil of Ballia district, Uttar Pradesh, India. It has a total of 1,274 families as of 2011. Narahi had a population of 8,960 as per 2011 census.

Youth leaders of Ballia
Thakur Ji Pathak  Indian Activist, Politician, Businessman From Narahi,Ballia

Administration
Narahi village is administrated by Gram Pradhan through its Gram Panchayat, who is elected representative of village as per constitution of India and Panchyati Raj Act.

According to the 2011 census, there were 4728 males and 4232 (total 8960) living in 1274 houses.

Nearby places
 Ballia
 Buxar
 Patna
 Ghazipur
 Rasra
 Chitbara Gaon
 Phephna
Dariapur (Ballia)

References

External links
Villages in Ballia Uttar Pradesh

Villages in Ballia district